The Danish Association of Architects (Danish: , abbreviated to AA), is an independent professional body for architects in Denmark.

History
The Danish Association of Architects was founded at the initiative of L. A. Petersen on 21 November 1879. The principal aim was to advance and promote architectural quality by influencing planning and design of the physical environment in the widest possible context.

Between 1951 and 2004, the Danish Association of Architects was part of the umbrella organisation National Association of Danish Architects (DAL/AA). In 2004, DAL/AA was demerged into the Danish Association of Architects, the Danish Union of Architects, and the industry organisation  (now ).

Building
The association is based in the former rectory of the Reformed Church in Copenhagen. The building is located in the street Åbenrå. It was acquired by the property investment company Karberghus and put through a renovation in 2014. AA was formerly based in the Architects' House in Strandgade, Christianshavn.

Presidents of Akademisk Arkitektforening/Danske Arkitekters Landsforbund 

 1886-18??: P.V. Ditlevsen (?)
 1897-1900 Albert Jensen
 1902-1904 Axel Berg
 1904-1907 Andreas Clemmensen
 1907-1909 Axel Berg (again)
 1909-1913 Anton Rosen
 1913-1917 Kristoffer Varming
 1919-1922 Henning Hansen
 1922-1924 Carl Brummer
 1924-1930 Emanuel Monberg
 1930-1930 Axel Preisler
 1930-1937 Alf Cock-Clausen
 1937-1942 Kay Fisker
 1942-1946 Thomas Havning
 1946-1951 Hans Erling Langkilde
 1952-1955 Helge Finsen
 1954-1960 Flemming Grut
 1955-1961 Philip Arctander
 1960-1966 Hans Henning Hansen
 1966-1969 Philip Arctander (again)
 1969-1973 Jacob Blegvad
 1973-1976 Hans Hartvig Skaarup
 1976-1979 Jørgen Pers
 1979-1985 Søren Nielsen
 1985-1991 Jens Rosenkjær
 1991-1997 Viggo Grünnet
 1997-2006 Gøsta Knudsen
 2006-2010 Rikke Krogh
 2010-   Natalie Mossin

Honorary members

 1909: H.B. Storck
 1913: Martin Nyrop
 1922: Andreas Clemmensen
 1924: Axel Berg
 1927: Anton Rosen
 1943: Gotfred Tvede
 1943: Poul Holsøe
 1944: Carl Brummer

Honorary Medal recipients
Akademisk Arkitektforenings's Honorary Medal is awarded to architects and organisations that have made a particularly important contribution to architecture. The medal is awarded in silver or gilded silver.

Foreign architects
 Arne Eide, Norway, 21 April 1934
 Ragnar Östberg, Sweden, 30 September 1936
 Ivar Tengbom, Sweden, 2 November 1939
 Eliel Saarinen, Finland, 21 November 1939
 Hakon Ahlberg, Sweden, 17 October 1941
 Auguste Perret, France, 7 January 1949
 Arnstein Arneberg, Norway, 26 September 1950
 Magnus Poulsson, Norway, 26 September 1950
 Alvar Aalto, Finland, 5 June1953
 Frank Lloyd Wright, United States, 16 May 1957
 Louis I. Kahn, United States, 19.9.1965
 Ludwig Mies van der Rohe, United States, 3 October 1965
 Sir Robert Matthew, United Kingdom, 8 November 1965
 Kenzo Tange, Japan, 10 October 1968
 Charles M. Sappenfield, United States, 27 November 1987

Danish architect 
 Alf Cock-Clausen, 25.11.1927
 Axel Berg, 21.11.1929
 Martin Borch, 21.11.1929
 Jens Vilhelm Petersen, 21.11.1929
 Ulrik Plesner, 16.9.1931
 Emil Jørgensen, 3.10.1933
 Andreas Fussing, 4.2.1939
 Axel Høeg-Hansen, 4.2.1939
 A.S.K. Lauritzen, 4.2.1939
 Carl Brummer, 12.7.1939
 Henning Hansen, 25.4.1941
 Poul Holsøe, 20.11.1943
 Valdemar Schmidt, 9.4.1944
 Andreas Jensen, 21.8.1948
 Hans Erling Langkilde, 14.1.1952
 Knud Millech, 21.11.1954
 Helge Finsen, 28.2.1957
 Ejnar Dyggve, 17.10.1957
 Flemming Grut, 12.3.1960
 Thomas Havning, 7.10.1961
 Arne Jacobsen, 11.2.1962
 Kay Fisker, 14.2.1963
 Vilhelm Lauritzen, 9.9.1964
 Hans Henning Hansen, 2.6.1966
 C.F. Møller, 31.10.1968
 Philip Arctander, 21.1.1969
 Mogens Lassen, 25.2.1971
 Esbjørn Hiort, 28.3.1972
 Kaj Gottlob, 11.7.1975
 Edmund Hansen, 10.12.1976
 Poul Erik Skriver, 20.11.1982
 Tobias Faber, 12.12.1985
 Hans Hartvig Skaarup, 6.11.1991
 Jacob Blegvad, 21.4.2001
 Knud Friis, 7.6.2002
 Jørn Utzon, 30.11.2006
 Jan Gehl, 8.6.2012

Other recipients
 V. Eilschou Holm, 9 June 1932
 Axel Bang, 2 November 1937
 Vilhelm Lorenzen, 5 February 1957

Organisations
 Oslo Arkitektforening, Oslo, 4.9.1931
 Södra Sveriges Byggnadstekniska Samfundet, Malmø, 9.11.1932
 Royal Institute of British Architects, London, 21.11.1934
 Norske Arkitekters Landsforbund, Oslo, 7.6.1935
 Finlands Arkitektförbund, Helsingfors, 27.11.1943
 Arkitektföreningen för Södra Sverige, Malmø, 8.12.1943
 The Architectural Association, London, 17.12.1947
 Det Kongelige Akademi for de Skønne Kunster, København, 31.3.1954
 The American Institute of Architects, Washington, 16.5.1957
 Svenska Arkitekters Riksförbund, Stockholm, 23.9.1961
 Stadsarkitektens Direktorat, København, 1.11.1961
 Vridsløse Andelsboligforening, Albertslund, 10.12.1976
 Albertslund Kommune, Albertslund, 10.12.1976

See also
 Danish Town Planning Institute

References

External links
 Official website

Organizations established in 1879
Professional certification in architecture
Architecture-related professional associations
Organizations based in Copenhagen